Rajpur Gomtipur is an affluent area located in Ahmedabad, India.

Neighbourhoods in Ahmedabad